Salma Frances Mancell-Egala is a Ghanaian diplomat and a member of the New Patriotic Party of Ghana. She is currently Ghana's ambassador to Turkey.

Ambassadorial appointment 
In July 2017, President Nana Akuffo-Addo named Salma Mancell-Egala as Ghana's ambassador to Turkey. She was among twenty two other distinguished Ghanaians who were named to head various diplomatic Ghanaian mission in the world.

References

Ambassadors of Ghana to Turkey
Living people
Ghanaian women ambassadors
Year of birth missing (living people)